One for Sorrow is the fifth studio album by the Finnish melodic death metal band Insomnium. It was released on October 12, 2011 in Finland, October 17, 2011 throughout the rest of Europe, and October 18, 2011 in the USA, on Century Media Records. It is the band's first release on the Century Media label.

Music videos were released for the tracks "One for Sorrow", "Through the Shadows", "Only One Who Waits", "Regain the Fire", and for the limited edition bonus track "Weather The Storm".

Track listing

Personnel
Niilo Sevänen – bass, lead vocals
Ville Friman – rhythm guitar, clean vocals
Ville Vänni – lead guitar
Markus Hirvonen – drums

References

2011 albums
Insomnium albums